Prince Albert of Saxe-Altenburg (Albert Heinrich Joseph Carl Viktor Georg Friedrich; Munich, 14 April 1843 – Serrahn, 22 May 1902) was a German prince of the ducal house of Saxe-Altenburg.

Biography

Family and early life
Prince Albert was the eldest son (third in order of birth but the only one who survived to adulthood) of Prince Eduard of Saxe-Altenburg (youngest son of Frederick, Duke of Saxe-Hildburghausen) and his second wife, Princess Luise Caroline Reuss of Greiz.

He entered the Russian army early in life, and attained the rank of Major-General in this service, but subsequently exchanged it for the Prussian army, where he became a general of cavalry.

Marriages
He was first married in Berlin on 6 May 1885 to Princess Marie of Prussia, widow of Prince Henry of the Netherlands.

They had two daughters:
 Princess Olga Elisabeth Carola Victoria Maria Anna Agnes Antoinette of Saxe-Altenburg (Schloß Albrechtsberg, 17 April 1886 – Münster, 13 January 1955); married on 20 May 1913 Karl Frederick, Count of Pückler-Burghauss and Freiherr von Groditz (1886–1945).
 Marie (Schloß Albrechtsberg, 6 June 1888 – Hamburg, 12 November 1947); married on 20 April 1911 Heinrich XXXV, Prince von Reuss of Köstritz (1887–1936, son of Heinrich VII, Prince Reuss of Köstritz); they divorced in 1921, and Heinrich remarried to Princess Marie Adelheid of Lippe-Biesterfeld. Marie adopted in 1942 Theodor Franz (Graf Praschma) von Sachsen-Altenburg (1934–2012). 

Princess Marie died in 1888 from the effects of puerperal fever.
A few years later on 13 December 1891, at Remplin, Albert married Duchess Helene of Mecklenburg-Strelitz. The couple had no children.

Albert was a conspicuous figure in Berlin society, and was a great favorite due to his "clever" mind, genial disposition, pleasant address, and enthusiasm as a sportsman. Marie died in 1888. Sources reported that the Emperor′s "arbitrary manners" became so intolerable to Albert and others, as they were used to the days of social courtesy under the old Wilhelm I.

Prince Albert died on 22 May 1902 at Remplin, his death "sincerely regretted" by all the royal houses in Germany.

Honours
He received the following orders and decorations:

Ancestry

References

1843 births
1902 deaths
Nobility from Munich
House of Saxe-Altenburg
Generals of Cavalry (Prussia)
Princes of Saxe-Altenburg
Recipients of the Order of the Netherlands Lion
Knights Grand Cross of the Order of Saints Maurice and Lazarus
Recipients of the Order of St. George of the Fourth Degree
Recipients of the Order of St. Vladimir, 2nd class
Recipients of the Order of St. Anna, 3rd class
Recipients of the Iron Cross, 2nd class